Laski Wielkie is a village in Poland with a population of 110.

References
Laski Wielkie – wieś w Polsce położona w województwie kujawsko-pomorskim, w powiecie żnińskim, w gminie Gąsawa.

W latach 1975-1998 miejscowość administracyjnie należała do województwa bydgoskiego.

W 1535 urodził się tu Erazm Gliczner, reformator religijny.

Laski Wielkie